The 2017–18 Damehåndboldligaen (known as HTH GO Ligaen for sponsorship reasons) is the 82nd season of Damehåndboldligaen, Denmark's premier handball league. Nykøbing Falster Håndboldklub are the defending champions.

Team information

Regular season

Standings

! In the 2017-18 season, no teams will be directly relegated as the league expands to 14 teams from the 2018-19 season. The last placed team of the regular season will play a best of three relegation playoff against 1. division's third-placed team (as both the winner and the runner-up of 1. division will be automatically promoted to the 2018–19 Damehåndboldligaen). Like the men's league, the championship play-offs will include 8 teams.

Results

In the table below the home teams are listed on the left and the away teams along the top.

Championship playoffs

Group 1

Group 2

Championship

Semi-finals

! Best of three matches. In the case of a tie after the second match, a third match is played. Highest ranking team in the regular season has the home advantage in the first and possible third match.

3rd place

! Best of three matches. In the case of a tie after the second match, a third match is played. Highest ranking team in the regular season has the home advantage in the first and possible third match.

Final

! Best of three matches. In the case of a tie after the second match, a third match is played. Highest ranking team in the regular season has the home advantage in the first and possible third match.

Relegation playoff
! Best of three matches. In the case of a tie after the second match, a third match is played. Highest ranking team in the regular season has the home advantage in the first and possible third match.

Top goalscorers

Regular season

Overall

Monthly awards

Number of teams by regions

References

External links
 Danish Handball Federaration 

Handboldligaen
Handboldligaen